Up to the Moment is the first compilation album by Australian rock band Mondo Rock, which was released in June 1985 through Polydor Records. It peaked at number 8 on the Kent Music Report albums chart.

Background 

Mondo Rock were formed in 1976 and released four studio albums by 1985, Primal Park (October 1979), Chemistry (July 1981), Nuovo Mondo (July 1982) and The Modern Bop (March 1984). Up to the Moment is a compilation album of tracks from those albums; it also includes their debut single, "The Fugitive Kind" (1978) and two new singles "Good Advice" (December 1984) and "The Moment" (April 1985).

Track listing

Charts

References 

1985 compilation albums
Mondo Rock albums
Albums produced by Ross Wilson
Compilation albums by Australian artists
PolyGram compilation albums
Polydor Records compilation albums
Albums produced by John L Sayers